Ophiocomina is a genus of brittle star belonging to the family Ophiocomidae.

Selected species
 Ophiocomina australis H.L. Clark, 1928
 Ophiocomina nigra (Abildgaard, in O.F. Müller, 1789)

References
 Ophiuroidea Data Base

Ophiocomidae
Ophiuroidea genera